Sir John Bourchier or Bourcher (c. 1595 – August 1660) was an English landowner and Puritan radical, who supported the Parliamentarian cause during the Wars of the Three Kingdoms. A regicide who voted for the Execution of Charles I in January 1649, he died in August 1660 awaiting trial following the Stuart Restoration.

Personal details
John Bourchier was born in 1595, eldest surviving son of William Bourchier (1559-c.1631) and Katherine Barrington (c.1565–1623). His father suffered from mental illness and was declared legally incompetent in 1598, the same year as his grandfather Sir Ralph Bourchier. He was brought up by his mother and her brother Sir Francis Barrington, a devout Puritan jailed by Charles I for opposing the Forced Loan in 1627. This relationship influenced his nephew's political and religious beliefs.

Career
He was probably educated at Christ's College, Cambridge, and was admitted to Gray's Inn in 1609/10. He was knighted in 1619.

In 1625, Bourchier was appointed as a Justice of the Peace for the three Yorkshire Ridings. When Charles dissolved Parliament and sought to raise money through the forced loans in 1627, Sir John was one of those who refused. At the outbreak of the English Civil War, he was arrested and imprisoned in York until 1643. He was elected Member of Parliament for Ripon in 1647; at Pride's Purge, he was one of the MPs permitted to keep his seat in Commons.

As a judge at the trial of King Charles, he was one of the signatories of the King's death warrant. After the Restoration, May 1660, Bourchier was too ill to be tried as a regicide, and died, unrepentant, a few months later.

"During these contests between the two Houses, touching the exceptions to be made, Sir John Bourchier, who had been one of the King's judges, and had rendered himself within the time limit by the proclamation, being of a great age and very infirm, was permitted to lodge at a private house belonging to one of his daughters.  In this place he was seized with so dangerous a fit of illness, that those about him who were his nearest relations, despairing of his recovery, and presuming that an acknowledgment from him of his sorrow, for the part he had in the condemnation of the King, might tend to procure some favour to them from those in power, they earnestly pressed him to give them that satisfaction.  But he being highly displeased with their request, rose suddenly from his chair, which for some days he had not been able to do without assistance; and receiving fresh vigour from the memory of that action, said, 'I tell you, it was a just act; God and all good men will own it.'  And having thus expressed himself, he sat down again, and soon after quietly ended his life."

Bourchier was a great-grandson of Margaret Pole, 8th Countess of Salisbury who had been beheaded by order of King Henry VIII; Charles I was a great-great-grandson of Margaret Tudor-a sister of King Henry VIII.  He was the great-great-great-grandson of Richard Neville, 16th Earl of Warwick, who was known as the "Kingmaker" for helping to place both Edward IV and Henry VI upon the throne during the War of the Roses.

References

Sources
 
 

1590s births
1660 deaths
Regicides of Charles I
Alumni of Christ's College, Cambridge
Members of Gray's Inn
17th-century English Puritans
Roundheads
English MPs 1640–1648
English MPs 1648–1653